Crossrail is a railway construction project in London.

Crossrail may also refer to:

 Crossrail 2, a proposed railway route across London
 Crossrail Glasgow, a proposed railway development in Central Scotland
 Aberdeen Crossrail, a proposed railway development in north-east Scotland
 Edinburgh Crossrail, a former railway service in south-east Scotland
 Crossrail Place, the structure within Canary Wharf station in London that is above the Crossrail platforms
 MTR Crossrail, the company that operates the Crossrail concession in London
Rail freight companies:
 Crossrail AG, a former rail freight company in Switzerland, with subsidiaries in Italy and Belgium
 Crossrail Benelux, a rail freight company in Belgium, subsidiary of BLS Cargo

See also
 East West Line (disambiguation)